Toni Jalo (born May 22, 1989) is a Finnish former professional ice hockey player. He last played for PaKa Kuusamo of the Finnish 2. Divisioona.

Jalo made his Liiga debut playing with TPS Turku during the 2007–08 Liiga season.

References

External links

1989 births
Living people
HC TPS players
HPK players
Mikkelin Jukurit players
SaiPa players
Vaasan Sport players
Finnish ice hockey forwards
Sportspeople from Turku